The 2014–15 RCD Espanyol season was the club's 113th season in its history and its 80th in the top-tier.

Transfers

 

In:

Out:

Current squad

Out on loan

Statistics

Appearances and goals
Updated as of 30 May 2015.

|-
! colspan=10 style=background:#dcdcdc; text-align:center| Players who have made an appearance or had a squad number this season but have been loaned out or transferred

|}

Competitions

Overall

La Liga

League table

Matches
Kickoff times are in CET.

Copa del Rey

Round of 32

Round of 16

Quarter-finals

Semi-finals

Results summary

Results by round

References

RCD Espanyol seasons
Espanyol
Espanyol